Cyptendoceras is an extinct nautiloid cephalopod included in the family Ellesmeroceratidae that lived in what would be North  and South America during the latter part of the Early Ordovician (late Arenig) from about 475 – 472 mya, existing for approximately .

Taxonomy 
Cyptendoceras was named by Ulrich and Foerste (1936). Teichert (1964, in the Treatise), included it in the endocerid family Proterocameroceratidae. Flower (1964) assigned it to the Baltoceratidae, at that time included in the Ellesmeroceratida. Kroger et al. (2007) reassigned it to the Ellesmeroceratidae on the basis of the ellesmeroceratid type siphuncle, removing it from the Baltoceratidae which had been reassigned to the Orthocerida.

Distribution 
Fossils of Cyptendoceras have been found in Argentina, Bolivia and the United States (Minnesota, Nevada, New Mexico, Texas, Vermont).

References

Further reading 
 Fossils (Smithsonian Handbooks) by David Ward

Cephalopod genera
Ordovician cephalopods
Molluscs of North America
Ordovician cephalopods of North America
Cephalopods of South America
Ordovician cephalopods of South America
Ordovician Argentina
Ordovician Bolivia
Ellesmerocerida